Chand Par Chadayee is a 1967 Indian Hindi-language science fiction film produced and directed by T. P. Sundaram. The film stars Dara Singh, Anwar Hussain, Bhagwan, G. Ratna and Padma Khanna.

Plot 
After landing on the Moon, the astronaut Anand and his associate Bhagu face off against many warriors and monsters from another planet.

Cast 
 Dara Singh as Anand
 Anwar Hussain as Barahatu
 Bhagwan as Bhagu
 G. Ratna as Shimoga
 Padma Khanna as Simi

Production 
Chand Par Chadayee was directed by T. P. Sundaram, who also produced it under Cauvery Productions. Cinematography was handled by M. Krishnasamy, and the editing by Joshi and M.S. Parthasarathy. The writer of the film is not credited onscreen, while Balakrishna Monj wrote the dialogues.

Soundtrack 
The soundtrack was composed by Usha Khanna, while S. H. Bihari and Asad Bhopali were lyricists.

References

External links 
 

1960s Hindi-language films
1960s science fiction films
Films about astronauts
Indian science fiction films
Mars in film
Moon in film
Hindi-language science fiction films